The 2016 Indy Eleven season was the club's third season of existence. The club continued to play in North American Soccer League, the second tier of the American soccer pyramid.

Roster

Out on loan

Staff
  Tim Hankinson – Head Coach
  Tim Regan – Assistant Coach

Transfers

Winter
Note: Flags indicate national team as has been defined under FIFA eligibility rules. Players may hold more than one non-FIFA nationality.

In:

Out:

Summer

In:

Out:

Friendlies

Competitions

NASL Spring season

Standings

Results summary

Results by round

Matches

NASL Fall season

Standings

Results summary

Results by round

Matches

NASL Playoff

Soccer Bowl

U.S. Open Cup

Squad statistics

Appearances and goals

|-
|colspan="14"|Players away on loan:

|-
|colspan="14"|Players who left Indy Eleven during the season:
|}

Goal scorers

Disciplinary record

References

External links
 

Indy Eleven seasons
American soccer clubs 2016 season
2016 in sports in Indiana
2016 North American Soccer League season